Istres (Occitan: Istre) is a commune in southern France, some 60 km (38 mi) northwest of Marseille. It is in the Provence-Alpes-Côte d'Azur region, in the Bouches-du-Rhône department, of which it is a subprefecture.

Location

Istres is adjacent to the Étang de Berre lagoon (the largest in Europe) and the Étang de l'Olivier lagoon. It is located some 60 km (38 mi) north-west of Marseille, 20 km (13 mi) south-west of Salon-de-Provence, 10 km (6 mi) north of Martigues and 45 km (28 mi) south-east of Arles. Istres is also adjacent to the plaine de la Crau and the Camargue national park.

Sports
The city has numerous sports facilities and exactly 102 clubs. Each year, a race is organized around the Étang de l'Olivier. Many runners participate. The town's main football club is FC Istres.

Facilities
Istres is the home of the Istres-Le Tubé Air Base (BA 125). This air base was one of three utilized by NASA as a contingency landing site for the Space Shuttle in the case of a Transoceanic Abort Landing . Istres shared this responsibility with Zaragoza, Spain and Moron, Spain.

Climate
Istres has a Mediterranean climate characterised by mild, humid winters and hot, dry summers. January and February are the coldest months, averaging temperatures of around 7 °C. July and August are the hottest months. The mean summer temperature is around 24 °C (75 °F) with an average maximum temperature around 32 °C. The amount of precipitation is around 566 mm (22 inches) per year. The mistral, a cold and often violent wind, blows through the city mostly in winter and spring.

Population

See also
Communes of the Bouches-du-Rhône department
FC Istres

References

External links
 Official website

Communes of Bouches-du-Rhône
Subprefectures in France
Bouches-du-Rhône communes articles needing translation from French Wikipedia